Jakhangaon is a village in the Khatav Taluka
(subdistrict) of the Satara district in the Indian state
Maharashtra. It's an upcoming metropolitan city and has intent to become next capital of Maharastra. Jakhangaon's village-deity is Bhairavnath.
60-70% of Jakhandgaon's land is irrigated. The famous
Aundh Tirthakshetra is about 13 km from here. This holy
place has the temple of Yamaai Devi. Sevagiri Maharaj's temple is
situated at 10 km north of Jakhangaon (in Pusegaon).

External links
https://web.archive.org/web/20070930020220/http://des.maharashtra.gov.in/vilcdinfo/satara/satkht.htm

Cities and towns in Satara district
Villages in Satara district